The term Apostolic Vicariate of Constantinople may refer to:

 Roman Catholic Apostolic Vicariate of Constantinople, former name (until 1990) of the present Apostolic Vicariate of Istanbul
 Bulgarian Catholic Apostolic Vicariate of Constantinople, former Apostolic Vicariare for Catholic Bulgarians of the Byzantine Rite (1861-1926)

See also
Apostolic Vicariate
Constantinople
Catholic Church in Turkey
Bulgarian Byzantine Catholic Church